The 2008–09 Scottish Youth Cup was the 26th season of the competition. The holders Rangers were defeated by under-19 league winners Hibernian in the final.

Calendar

First round

Second round

Third round

Fourth round

Quarter-finals

Semi-finals

Final

References
 SFA – Scottish Youth Cup archive

Youth cup
Scottish Youth Cup
Scottish Youth Cup seasons